Secret law refers to legal authorities that require compliance that are classified or otherwise withheld from the public.

Secret law in the United States 

Since about 2015 the branches of the United States federal government have accused one another of creating secret law.  Journalists, scholars, and anti-secrecy activists have also made similar allegations.  Scholarly analysis has shown that secret law is present in all three branches.  One scholar, Professor Dakota Rudesill, recommends that the country affirmatively decide whether to tolerate secret law, and proposes principles for governing it, including: public law's supremacy over secret law; no secret criminal law; public notification of creation of secret law; presumptive sunset and publication dates; and availability of all secret law to Congress.

The term has been used in reference to some counterterrorist measures taken by the Bush Administration following the September 11, 2001 terrorist attacks. The Patriot Act has been referred to as having secret interpretations.

Secret rules in UK public places
In the United Kingdom, many open places freely accessible by the public are actually privately owned public spaces (POPS). Information on ownership is considered confidential, and not provided either by the owners, or by local councils that have the information. As in any private property the owner may require visitors to abide by specified rules; but people freely accessing the place are not informed of the rules, which may nevertheless be enforced by security guards. Typical prohibitions which do not apply to genuinely public spaces include protesting, and photography.

Councils mostly refused to provide information on existing and planned pseudo-public spaces. They also refused to say how information could be obtained, or to provide information on private restrictions on exercising the other rights people have on genuinely public land. Councils were criticized for being under the influence of property developers and corporate owners. Siân Berry, at the time a member of the London Assembly, said "Being able to know what rules you are being governed by, and how to challenge them, is a fundamental part of democracy".

Literature 
Secret laws and their negative effects are described in Franz Kafka's novel Der Prozess (The Trial).

See also 
Secret treaty
Glasnost
Freedom of information legislation
Ignorantia juris non excusat
Gilmore v. Gonzales
Promulgation

References

Law by type
Secrecy
Promulgation

Further reading 
 Arnold, Jason Ross (2014). Secrecy in the Sunshine Era: The Promise and Failures of U.S. Open Government Laws. University Press of Kansas. . See chapter 5.
 Nelson, BLS (2019). "Secret Law Revisited." Ratio Juris.